Protiaridae is a family of cnidarians belonging to the order Anthoathecata.

Genera:
 Halitiara Fewkes, 1882
 Halitiarella Bouillon, 1980
 Latitiara Xu & Huang, 1990
 Paratiara Kramp & Damas, 1925
 Protiara Haeckel, 1879

References

Filifera
Cnidarian families